Burr is a surname. Notable people with the surname include:

Aaron Burr (1756–1836), third U.S. vice president
Aaron Burr Sr. (1716–1757), American Presbyterian minister and college educator
Amelia Josephine Burr (1878–1968), American poet
Albert G. Burr (1829–1882), American politician
Benjamin Burr (1818–1894), American politician
Bill Burr (born 1968), American stand-up comedian and actor
Chandler Burr (born 1963), American journalist and author
Claudia Burr (born 1968), Chilean actress
Clive Burr (1957–2013), English drummer
David H. Burr (1803–1875), American cartographer and surveyor
Esther Edwards Burr (1732–1758), wife of Aaron Burr Sr.
Frances Ellen Burr (1831-1923), American suffragist
 George Dominicus Burr, surveyor, after whom Mount Burr, South Australia was named (father of Thomas Burr)
George Elbert Burr (1859–1939), American painter and printmaker
George Frederick Burr (1819–1857), English cricketer and priest 
George Lincoln Burr (1857–1938), American historian 
Harold Saxton Burr (1889–1973), American anatomist
Jeff Burr (born 1963), American movie actor, scenarist and producer
John Burr (1831–1893), Scottish painter
John Pierre Burr (1792–1864), American abolitionist
Lachlan Burr (born 1992), Australian rugby league footballer
Malcolm Burr (1878–1954), English entomologist
Raymond Burr (1917–1993), Canadian-American actor
Richard Burr (born 1955), American businessman and senator from North Carolina
Robert N. Burr (1916–2014), American historian
Shawn Burr (1966–2013), Canadian ice hockey player
Tanya Burr (born 1989), English vlogger and blogger
Theodore Burr (1771–1822/24), American inventor of the Burr Truss
Theodosia Burr Alston (1783–1813), née Burr, daughter of American politician Aaron Burr
Thomas Burr (1813–1866), Deputy Surveyor General of South Australia 1839–46

See also
 Buer (disambiguation)
 Burr (disambiguation)

Lists of people by surname